was a title assigned to samurai officials during the feudal period of Japan. Bugyō is often translated as commissioner, magistrate, or governor, and other terms would be added to the title to describe more specifically a given official's tasks or jurisdiction.

Pre-Edo period
In the Heian period (794–1185), the post or title of bugyō would be applied only to an official with a set task; once that task was complete, the officer would cease to be called bugyō.  However, in the Kamakura period (1185–1333) and later, continuing through the end of the Edo period (1603–1868), posts and title came to be created on a more permanent basis.  Over time, there came to be 36 bugyō in the bureaucracy of the Kamakura shogunate.

In 1434, Ashikaga Yoshinori established the Tosen-bugyō to regulate foreign affairs for the Ashikaga shogunate.

In 1587, a Japanese invading army occupied Seoul; and one of Toyotomi Hideyoshi's first acts was to create a bugyō for the city, replicating a familiar pattern in an unfamiliar setting.

Edo period
During the Edo period, the number of bugyō reached its largest extent as the bureaucracy of the Tokugawa shogunate expanded on an ad hoc basis, responding to perceived needs and changing circumstances.

List

 Edo machi-bugyō (江戸町奉行) – Magistrates or municipal administrators of Edo.
 Kita-machi-bugyō (北町奉行) – North Edo magistrate.
 Minami-machi-bugyō (南町奉行) – South Edo magistrate.
 Fushin-bugyō (普請奉行) – Superintendents of Public Works.
 Gaikoku-bugyō (外国奉行) – Commissioners in charge of trade and diplomatic relations with foreign countries after 1858.
 Gunkan-bugyō  (軍鑑奉行) – Commissioners in charge of naval matters (post-1859).
Gusoku-bugyō (具足奉行) – Commissioners in charge of supplying the shogunal armies.
 Bugu-bugyō (武具奉行) – Commissioners in charge of supplying the shogunal armies (post-1863), replaced Gusoku-bugyō.
Hakodate bugyō (箱館奉行) – Overseers of the port of Hakodate and neighboring territory of Ezo.
 Haneda bugyō (羽田奉行) – Overseers of the port of Haneda; commissioners of coastal defenses near Edo (post-1853).
 Hyōgo bugyō (兵庫奉行) – Overseers of the port of Hyōgo (post-1864).
 Jisha-bugyō (寺社奉行) – Ministers or administrators for religious affairs; overseers of the country's temples and shrines.
 Jiwari-bugyō (地割奉行)- Commissioners of surveys and surveying.
 Kanagawa bugyō (神奈川奉行) – Overseers of the port of Kanagawa (post-1859).
 Kanjō-bugyō (勘定奉行) – Ministers or administrators for shogunal finance (post-1787).
 Gundai (郡代)– Deputies.
 Daikan (代官)- Deputies.
 Kane-bugyō (金奉行) – Superintendents of the Treasury.
 Kura-bugyō (倉庫奉行) – Superintendents of Cereal Stores.
 Kinza (金座) – Gold za or monopoly office (post-1595).
 Ginza (銀座) – Silver za or monopoly office (post-1598).
 Dōza (銅座) – Copper za or monopoly office (post-1636) and (1701–1712, 1738–1746, 1766–1768).
 Shuza (朱座) – Cinnabar za or monopoly office (post-1609).
 Kanjō-ginmiyaku – Comptrollers of Finance.
 Kantō gundai – Kantō deputies.
 Kinzan-bugyō (金山奉行) – Commissioners of mines.
 Kyoto shoshidai (京都所司代) -- Shogunal representatives at Kyoto.
 Kyoto machi-bugyō (京都町奉行) – Magistrates or municipal administrators of Kyoto.
 Fushimi bugyō (伏見奉行) – Magistrates or municipal administrators of Fushimi (post-1620).
 Nara bugyō (奈良奉行) – Governors of Nara.
 Machi-bugyō (町奉行) – Magistrates or municipal administrators in shogunal cities: Edo, Kyoto, Nagasaki, Nara, Nikkō, and Osaka.
 Nagasaki bugyō (長崎奉行) – Governor of Nagasaki.
 Niigata bugyō (新潟奉行) – Overseers of the port of Niigata.
 Nikkō bugyō (日光奉行) – Overseers of Nikkō.
 Osaka jōdai (大阪城代) – Overseers of Osaka Castle.
 Osaka machi-bugyō (大阪町奉行) – Magistrates or municipal administrators in shogunal cities like  Osaka.
 Sakai bugyō (堺奉行) – Overseers of the town of Sakai.
 Rōya-bugyō (牢屋奉行) – Commissioners of the shogunal prison.
 Sado bugyō (佐渡奉行) – Overseers of the island of Sado.
 Sakuji-bugyō (作事奉行) – Commissioners of works (post-1632).
 Shimoda bugyō (下田奉行) – Overseers of the port of Shimoda.
 Sunpu jōdai (駿府城代) – Overseers of Sunpu Castle.
 Uraga bugyō (浦賀奉行) – Overseers of the port of Uraga.
 Yamada bugyō (山田奉行) -- Representatives of the shogunate at Ise.
 Zaimoku-ishi bugyō (材木石奉行) - Overseer of construction materials for the Shōgun's properties (from 1647)
 Zen bugyō (膳奉行) – Overseer of victuals for the Shōgun's table

Meiji period
In the early years of the Meiji Restoration, the title of bugyō continued to be used for government offices and conventional practices where nothing else had been created to replace the existing Tokugawa system.  For example, the commander-in-chief of artillery under the early Meiji government was called the Hohei-bugyō. As the new government passed its numerous reforms, the term bugyō was soon phased out of usage.

See also
 Shugo

Notes

References

 Beasley, William G. (1951). Britain and the Opening of Japan, 1834–1858. London: Luzac & Company.  reprinted by Routledge, London, 1995.   (paper)
 . (1955). [https://books.google.com/books?id=jjOCAAAAIAAJ&q=Niigata+bugyo Documents on Japanese Foreign Policy, 1853–1868.] London: Oxford University Press. [reprinted by RoutledgeCurzon, London, 2001.   (cloth)]
 Brinkley, Frank. (1915).  A History of the Japanese People from the Earliest Times to the End of the Meiji Era. London: Encyclopædia Britannica.
 Coaldrake, William H. (1996)  Architecture and Authority in Japan. London: Routledge.  (paper)
 Cullen, Louis M. (2003).  A History of Japan, 1582-1941: Internal and External Worlds. Cambridge: Cambridge University Press.  (cloth) --  (paper)
 Cunningham, Don. (2004).   Taiho-Jutsu: Law and Order in the Age of the Samurai. Tokyo: Tuttle Publishing.   (cloth)
 Nussbaum, Louis-Frédéric and Käthe Roth. (2005).  Japan encyclopedia. Cambridge: Harvard University Press. ;  OCLC 58053128
 Hall, John Whitney. (1955)  Tanuma Okitsugu: Forerunner of Modern Japan. Cambridge: Harvard University Press.
 Jansen, Marius B. (1995).  Sakamoto Ryoma and the Meiji Restoration.  New York: Columbia University Press. 
 . (1995). Warrior Rule in Japan. Cambridge: Cambridge University Press. 
 Kinihara, Misako. The Establishment of the Tosen bugyō in the Reign of Ashikaga Yoshinori (唐船奉行の成立 : 足利義教による飯尾貞連の登用), Tokyo Woman's Christian University. Essays and Studies. 44:2, 27–53.
 James Murdoch. (1926). A History of Japan. London: Kegan Paul, Trench, Trubner & Co.  reprinted by Routledge, 1996. 
 Naito, Akira, Kazuo Hozumi, and H. Mack Horto. (2003).  Edo: the City that Became Tokyo. Tokyo: Kodansha. 
 Ponsonby-Fane, Richard A.R. (1956). Kyoto: the Old Capital, 794–1869. Kyoto: Ponsonby-Fane Memorial.
 Roberts, Luke Shepherd. (1998).  Mercantilism in a Japanese Domain: The Merchant Origins of Economic Nationalism in 18th Century Tosa.  Cambridge: Cambridge University Press. 
 Sasama Yoshihiko (1995). Edo Machi Bugyō Jiten. Tokyo: Kashiwa-shobo.
 Sato, Yasunobu. (2001).  Commercial Dispute Processing and Japan. Amsterdam: Wolters Kluwer.   (cloth)
 Schaede, Ulrike. (2000). Cooperative Capitalism: Self-Regulation, Trade Associations, and the Antimonopoly Law in Japan.  Oxford: Oxford University Press.  (cloth)
 Screech, Timon. (2006). Secret Memoirs of the Shoguns: Isaac Titsingh and Japan, 1779–1822''. London: RoutledgeCurzon. 
 Shimada, Ryuto. (2005).  The Intra-Asian Trade in Japanese Copper by the Dutch East India Company. Leiden: Brill Publishers.  (cloth)
 Takekoshi, Yosaburo. (1930).  The economic aspects of the history of the civilization of Japan. New York: Macmillan.

Government of feudal Japan
Officials of the Tokugawa shogunate